Chota is a town in Northern Peru, capital of the province Chota in the region Cajamarca.  The city is the seat of the Territorial Prelature of Chota.

History

In pre-Inca times, chotanos territories were occupied by various cultures, such as Los Huambos in the West and Cuismanco in the east, getting a strong influence of the Chavin, Wari and Moche cultures of which there are archaeological remains of great importance as Pacopampa, Negropampa, Rejopampa and others.

The foundation of the city of Chota took place on two dates: one in 1552 and another in 1559, it is not clear if it was on these two dates.

During the War of the Pacific, after the Battle of San Pablo the Araucanian (from the city of Arauco) entered Chota, to which the people decided to poison the waters of the river Colpamayo and by that the Chilean ordered the burning of the city.

On August 29, 1882, Chota was burned by Chilean troops in retaliation for the defeat they suffered in San Pablo and consider it as the headquarters of the North. Thousands of homes fell, the church was also burned, saving the image of the Patroness, Mary Immaculate, whose dogma was proclaimed on December 8.

Geography
The city is bounded on three sides by rivers of the westernmost Amazon basin: to the north is the San Mateo, to the east the Colpamayo.  Both flow broadly westward into the Rio Chotano, which forms Chota's south-western boundary.

Climate
The city generally has a temperate climate. The rainfalls are due to El Niño cyclically because of the proximity to the Equator and for being a city in thermal ground floor. It has a mild winter and a hot and rainy summer from November to April. The average temperature is 17.8 °C.

Festivals

The main festival of the city is the San Juan Bautista festival. It starts on June 13 with the triumphal entry in a procession, bearing to June 24 as the central day. The activities that are carried out are:

 The identity of the chotanos day, held on 22 June, which pays tribute to José Manuel Silva and Anaximando Becerra Vega Mateola, independence hero and poet respectively. Both are famous people of Chota.
 The festival of Sanjuanpampa, held at the farm of Corepuquio where festivals and concerts on 23 and 24 of June are performed. Also held here cultural events, typical dishes, dances, Paso horse contests, bullfights, motocross and soccer, but in daytime hours.
 The election of the beauty "Flor de Chota", where ladies compete from all the villages and towns of the district of Chota. It takes place in two phases: qualifying and the grand final on 23 and 24 June respectively.
On the days 25, 26 and 27 of June, bullfights are held with international cartel in the famous Plaza de toros El Vizcaino, the second largest in Peru after the Plaza de toros de Acho in Lima. For this reason it is considered the Bullfighting Capital of Northern Peru.

References

External links
  Chota district community portal

Populated places in the Cajamarca Region